The 1993 E3 Prijs Vlaanderen was the 36th edition of the E3 Harelbeke cycle race and was held on 27 March 1993. The race started and finished in Harelbeke. The race was won by Mario Cipollini of the GB–MG Maglificio team.

General classification

References

1993 in Belgian sport
1993